Srakovlje is a dispersed settlement north of Kranj in the Upper Carniola region of Slovenia.

References

External links

Srakovlje at Geopedia

Populated places in the City Municipality of Kranj